Panakkad is a town in Malappuram municipality in the state of Kerala, India. It is located on the banks of Kadalundippuzha river. Panakkad Thangal family resides in this village. Panakkad serves as one of the residential area of Malappuram city. The English and Foreign Languages University started its campus at Panakkad in 2013-14 academic year

Suburbs of Malappuram